Gozmanyina is a genus of cosmochthoniids in the family Cosmochthoniidae. There are at least three described species in Gozmanyina.

Species
These three species belong to the genus Gozmanyina:
 Gozmanyina golosovae (Gordeeva, 1980)
 Gozmanyina majestus (Marshall & Reeves, 1971)
 Gozmanyina pehuen R. Martínez & Casanueva, 1996

References

Further reading

 

Acariformes
Articles created by Qbugbot